Elena Popovska (born January 6, 1990) is a Macedonian swimmer, who specialized in sprint freestyle events. She represented the Republic of Macedonia at the 2008 Summer Olympics, placing among the top 50 swimmers in the 100 m freestyle.

Popovska was invited by FINA through the Universality rule to compete as a lone female swimmer for Macedonia in the men's 100 m freestyle at the 2008 Summer Olympics in Beijing. Swimming against fellow Olympic debutants Madeleine Scerri of Malta and Olga Hachatryan of Turkmenistan in heat one, Popovska overhauled a minute barrier with a lifetime best of 59.93 to blaze her way for the second spot and forty-seventh overall on the evening prelims, but failed to advance to the semifinals.

References

External links
NBC Olympics Profile

1990 births
Living people
Macedonian female swimmers
Olympic swimmers of North Macedonia
Swimmers at the 2008 Summer Olympics
Macedonian female freestyle swimmers
Sportspeople from Skopje